Safra (also Romanized as Şafrā; also known as Şafrá-ye Ka‘bī and Şafrā-ye Ka‘bī) is a village in Hoseyni Rural District, in the Central District of Shadegan County, Khuzestan Province, Iran. At the 2006 census, its population was 138, in 20 families.

References 

Populated places in Shadegan County